Lorenzo Sanz Durán (born 16 June 1971) is a former Spanish basketball player and manager. He is the older brother of footballers Paco and Fernando Sanz, and the oldest son of Lorenzo Sanz, who was president of Real Madrid for five years. He is a commentator on Real Madrid games on Real Madrid TV, along with Siro López and Vicente Paniagua as well as presenter of the Las Carreras program, which is broadcast on www.lascarreras.com and on Teledeporte, where it is held at Madrid's Hipódromo de la Zarzuela and which follows the Spanish horse racing circuit live.

Biography
Sanz played two seasons for the Lafayette Leopards. Later he would have a modest career as a player, retiring in 1999 from basketball. After leaving the sport, he would take over the reins as director general of Real Madrid, his time in the offices being as brief as successful, since he won the Liga ACB title in the only year he was in command of the merengue team. In a tight final against FC Barcelona, Real Madrid broke all odds and won the league in the fifth game at the Palau Blaugrana. Shortly after, his father, who at that time presided over Real Madrid, would lose the elections against Florentino Pérez, and Sanz himself would cease to hold his position as technical director, although the new president offered him to continue in office.

Personal life
Sanz is the brother-in-law of Míchel Salgado.

Awards and accomplishments

Professional career
 FIBA EuroCup Champion: (1997)

References

1971 births
Living people
Small forwards
Liga ACB players
Lafayette Leopards men's basketball players
Real Madrid Baloncesto players
Spanish expatriate basketball people in the United States
Spanish men's basketball players
Sanz family